The Martin-Baker Mk.6 is a British rocket-assisted ejection seat designed and built by Martin-Baker. Introduced in the 1960s, the Mk.6 has been installed in combat and training aircraft worldwide.

History
The Mk.6 seat was developed from the earlier Mk.4 design by the addition of a rocket pack to enable zero-zero capability. A variant of the Mk.6 was fitted with a compressed air cylinder crew breathing system to provide underwater ejection capability for the carrier-borne Blackburn Buccaneer aircraft.

Operation sequence
Operating either the seat pan or face blind firing handles initiates aircraft canopy jettison, as the canopy clears an interlock is removed which allows the main gun located at the rear of the seat to fire, the main gun is a telescopic tube with two explosive charges that fire in sequence. As the seat moves up its guide rails an emergency oxygen supply is activated and personal equipment tubing and communication leads are automatically disconnected, leg restraints also operate.

As the seat moves further up and out of the aircraft the rocket pack is fired by a lanyard attached to the cockpit floor. A steel rod, known as the drogue gun, is fired and extracts two small parachutes to stabilise the seat's descent path. A barostatic mechanism prevents the main parachute from opening above an altitude of 10,000 ft (3,000 m) A time delay mechanism operates the main parachute below this altitude in conjunction with another device to prevent the parachute opening at high speed. The seat then separates from the occupant for a normal parachute descent, a manual separation handle is provided should the automatic system fail.

Applications

The Mk.6 ejection seat has been installed in the following aircraft types:
List from Martin-Baker.

Aermacchi MB-326/Atlas Impala
Atlas Cheetah
Blackburn Buccaneer
Dassault Balzac V
Dassault Mirage III
Dassault Ouragan
Dassault-Breguet Super Étendard
Dornier Do 31
Fiat G.91
FMA IA 58 Pucará
Hawker Siddeley P.1127
Hunting H.126
IAI Dagger
IAI Kfir

Specifications (Mk.6)
Maximum operating height: 50,000 ft (15,240 m)
Minimum operating height: Ground level
Minimum operating speed: Zero
Maximum operating speed: 600 knots indicated airspeed

References

Notes

Bibliography

 * Philpott, Bryan. Eject!! Eject!!. Shepperton, Surrey. Ian Allan Ltd., 1989.

External links

"Seat and Aircraft - 926 Lives Saved" a 1965 advertisement for the Mk. 6HA in Flight

Martin-Baker ejection seats